Axelrod or Akselrod (variant: Axelrad, meaning "axle wheel") is a surname. Notable people with the surname include:

 Albert Axelrod (1921–2004), American Olympic medalist foil fencer
 Barry Axelrod (born 1946), American sports agent
 Beth Axelrod, American executive
 Daniel I. Axelrod (1910–1998), American paleoecologist, botanist, and geologist, known by author abbreviation "Axelrod"
 David Axelrod (born 1955), American political consultant who worked on campaigns of Barack Obama and Richard M. Daley
 David Axelrod (musician) (1936–2017), American classical musician
 Donald Axelrod (1916–1999), American academic
 Dylan Axelrod (born 1985), American MLB baseball player
 George Axelrod (1922–2003), American screenwriter, producer, playwright, and film director
 Herbert R. Axelrod (1927–2017), American author, publisher and ichthyologist
 Jason David Axelrod AKA David Ha'ivri (born 1967), Jewish-Israeli settler activist and spokesman
 Jim Axelrod (born 1963), American reporter for CBS
 John Axelrod (born 1966), American conductor
 Julius Axelrod (1912–2004), American biochemist who won a share of the Nobel Prize in Physiology or Medicine in 1970
 Lyubov Axelrod (1868–1946), Russian Marxist philosopher and revolutionary
 Max M. Axelrod (1911–2004), American philanthropist and activist
 Meer Akselrod (1902–1970), Russian painter known for paintings of Jewish life in the Russian Empire and the Soviet Union
 Paul Axelrod (born 1949), British author and professor and dean at York University
 Pavel Akselrod (1850–1928), also spelled Pavel Axelrod, Russian Menshevik revolutionary
 Robert Axelrod (born 1943), American professor of political science at the University of Michigan who has written about the evolution of cooperation
 Robert Axelrod (actor) (1949–2019), American actor who has been in movies and TV shows, often as a voice actor
 Victor Axelrod, American independent music producer and artist

Surnames from given names
Jewish surnames